Selitrennoye is a rural locality (a selo) and the administrative center of Selitrensky Selsoviet, Kharabalinsky District, Astrakhan Oblast, Russia. The population was 1,978 as of 2010. There are 23 streets.

Geography 
Selitrennoye is located 34 km southeast of Kharabali (the district's administrative centre) by road. Volnoye is the nearest rural locality.

References 

Rural localities in Kharabalinsky District